The 2017 Cupa Ligii Final was the final match of the 2016–17 Cupa Ligii, played between Dinamo București and Poli Timișoara. Dinamo București won the match with 2–0.

Match

References

External links
 Official site 

2017
2016–17 in Romanian football
2017